WQFM (92.1 FM, "QFM") is a radio station licensed to Nanticoke, Pennsylvania. Owned by Times-Shamrock Communications, it broadcasts a hot adult contemporary format serving the Wilkes-Barre-Scranton area.

History

WMJW, WEAY, WTZR
On October 31, 1973, the station signed on the air as WMJW.  It was owned by Thunder Broadcasting and carried an automated adult contemporary format. In 1988, it changed its call sign to WEAY and switched again in 1994 to WTZR.

WQFM Oldies
The call letters became WQFM in 1996.  It played oldies of the 1960s and 70s, known as "Oldies 92 and 100", then switched to Hot Adult Contemporary, branded as QFM and later The Q. On June 30, 2008, the station dropped the Hot AC format and began playing music exclusively from The Beatles. On July 3, 2008, the station switched back to an oldies format, branded as "Cool 92.1 and 100.1".

In addition, it was the flagship station of the Wilkes-Barre/Scranton Penguins minor league hockey team until 2009. Tom Grace was the play-by-play announcer for the "Baby Pens" for the majority of the franchise's existence prior to the 2007–2008 season, when former local TV weatherman Scott Stuccio replaced him.

WFUZ Alternative Rock
On September 16, 2010, WQFM changed its format to alternative rock, branded as FM 92.1 and changed its call letters to WFUZ.  It later began simulcasting the sports radio format, including ESPN Radio, from co-owned AM 630 WEJL. WFUZ returned to alternative rock as Fuzz 92.1 on September 19, 2012.  It switched its branding to Alt 92.1 on February 25, 2017.

The station each summer held a small concert at the Toyota Pavilion at Montage Mountain in Scranton, beginning in 2013.  It was known as Fuzz Fest, showcasing local and nation bands, especially groups that were looking to break through.

Return to WQFM
On November 4, 2020, WFUZ dropped its alternative rock format and began playing Christmas music. On December 28, 2020, the station flipped to a 90's-leaning hot AC format as Q92.1, reinstating the WQFM calls. On November 15, 2021 WQFM began simulcasting on 100.1 WQFN/Forest City, replacing its simulcast of WEJL.

On April 1, 2022, WQFM went jockless and rebranded as QFM. Additionally, the station dropped its focus on 90's hits and segued to a straight hot AC format with current hits.

Simulcasts and translators

One full-power station is licensed to simulcast the programming of WQFM:

Previous logo

References

External links

QFM (FM)
Hot adult contemporary radio stations in the United States